Sir Thomas Reginald St. Johnston  (8 June 1881 – 29 August 1950) was a British colonial administrator, physician, author and British Army officer. 

St. Johnston was the son of Edward Cocks Johnston. He was educated at Cheltenham College and the University of Birmingham, before studying law at Middle Temple and medicine at Westminster Hospital. He became a Member of the Royal College of Surgeons and a Licentiate of the Royal College of Physicians. He worked briefly for the Local Government Board in 1906 before joining the Colonial Service the following year.

Between 1907 and 1917 he worked in various administrative roles in Fiji, before being seconded for service in the First World War and attached to the War Office as a Royal Army Medical Corps officer. In 1919 he was posted to the Falkland Islands as colonial secretary. St. Johnston was then colonial secretary in the Leeward Islands  from 1920 to 1925, and was posted to Dominica, Antigua and Saint Kitts and Nevis between 1925 and 1929. He was governor of the Leeward Islands from 1929 until his retirement in 1936. He was made a Knight Commander of the Order of St Michael and St George in the 1931 Birthday Honours. During the Second World War he returned to military duties and joined the Ministry of Supply in 1942.

In 1906 he married Alice Lethbridge. St. Johnston was the author of sixteen books.

References

1881 births
1950 deaths
Alumni of the University of Birmingham
British Army personnel of World War I
British Army personnel of World War II
Civil servants in the Colonial Office
Governors of the Leeward Islands
Knights Commander of the Order of St Michael and St George
Members of the Royal College of Physicians
Members of the Royal College of Surgeons
People educated at Cheltenham College
Royal Army Medical Corps officers